The Union for the Republic National Movement (UNIR NM) is a political party of the Democratic Republic of the Congo (DRC) that was formed in 2001 by Frédéric Boyenga Bofala.

Mission 

The party describes its mission as:

"To remake the republic is the sacred mission of a generation - we must reconcile ourselves with our history, without a spirit of vengeance.  We must reconcile ourselves with our dead"

Chronology 

 2001: UNIR NM formed during the Second Congo War
 2003: UNIR MN boycotts the Global and All-Inclusive Agreement that forms the Transitional Government of the Democratic Republic of the Congo
 2005: UNIR NM campaigns against the new constitution
 2006: UNIR NM boycotts the general elections

External links 
 Union for the Republic National Movement - UNIR NM official site (in French)

Political parties in the Democratic Republic of the Congo